Metrobius (lived 1st century BC) was an actor and apparently a talented singer, in the Roman Republic, he was said to be the lover of Lucius Cornelius Sulla Felix, the famed general and dictator.  Metrobius is mentioned twice by Plutarch in his Parallel Lives, who clearly disapproves of his relationship with Sulla. These excerpts are as follows.

"It was this laxity, as it seems, which produced in him [Sulla] a diseased propensity to amorous indulgence and an unrestrained voluptuousness, from which he did not refrain even in his old age, but continued his youthful love for Metrobius, an actor."

"However, even though he [Sulla] had such a wife at home, he consorted with actresses, harpists, and theatrical people, drinking with them on couches all day long. For these were the men who had most influence with him now: Roscius the comedian, Sorex the archmime, and Metrobius the impersonator of women, for whom, though past his prime, he continued up to the last to be passionately fond, and made no denial of it."

Though it's unclear the length of the sexual relationship between Metrobius and Sulla, the latter took other partners during his career, but remained close friends with Metrobius until his retirement.

In fiction
In the historical fiction series Masters of Rome, by Colleen McCullough, the adolescent Metrobius is Sulla's sometime lover and later his client. He gives up the stage to accompany the former dictator Sulla into retirement in the year 79 BC.

In Raffaello Giovagnoli's novel Spartacus (1874) an actor named Metrobius accidentally overhears a conversation concerning a gladiator's plot and informs Julius Caesar about it.

References

Plutarch, Parallel Lives, "Sulla" 

1st-century BC deaths
Ancient Greek actors
Ancient Roman actors
Year of birth unknown
Female impersonators
Ancient LGBT people
Gay actors